No. 306 "Toruń" Polish Fighter Squadron was one of several Polish squadrons in the Royal Air Force (RAF) during the Second World War. It was formed as part of an agreement between the Polish Government in Exile and the United Kingdom in 1940.

History

Formed on 28 August 1940 at RAF Church Fenton, the squadron inherited the traditions, along with the emblem and a large part of the initial crew, of the pre-war Polish Torunian Fighter Squadron. The bear climbing a tree (Coat of arms of Madrid) was an emblem of the No. 605 (County of Warwick) Squadron, the unit of the first (British) commander of the new squadron, F/Cdr. Douglas Scott.

Throughout its existence, the squadron claimed 68 confirmed kills, 16½ probable and an additional 26 damaged. In addition, the crews of the 306 downed 59 enemy V1 flying bombs. It was disbanded in December 1946 after the end of World War II.

Commanding officers

Aircraft
 Hawker Hurricane Mk I – from 4 September 1940
 Hawker Hurricane Mk IIA – from 5 April 1941
 Supermarine Spitfire Mk I i Mk II – from 12 July 1941
 Supermarine Spitfire Mk VB – from 11 December 1941
 Supermarine Spitfire Mk IX – from 29 November 1942
 Supermarine Spitfire Mk VB – from 13 March 1943
 North American Mustang Mk III – from 26 March 1944

See also
Polish Air Forces in Great Britain
Polish contribution to World War II

References

Notes

Bibliography

 Delve, Ken. The Source Book of the RAF. Shrewsbury, Shropshire, UK: Airlife Publishing Ltd., 1994. .
 Gretzyngier, Robert. Polish Aces of World War 2, Botley, Oxford, UK: Osprey Publishing, 1998.
 Halley, James J. The Squadrons of the Royal Air Force & Commonwealth, 1918–1988. Tonbridge, Kent, UK: Air Britain (Historians) Ltd., 1988. .
 Jefford, Wing Commander C.G. RAF Squadrons: a Comprehensive Record of the Movement and Equipment of all RAF Squadrons and their Antecedents since 1912. Shrewsbury, UK: Airlife Publishing Ltd., 2001. .
 Rawlings, John D.R. Fighter Squadrons of the RAF and their Aircraft. London: Macdonald and Jane's (Publishers) Ltd., 1969 (Revised edition 1976). .
 Grodyński, Andrzej S.T. (306 Squadron Pilot) The Grodyński Brigade. Charleston, USA: CreateSpace 2013.  .

External links

 Polish Squadrons in the RAF
 Photo Gallery of 306 Squadron
 History of No.'s 300–318 Squadrons at RAF Web
 Personnel of the Polish Air Force in Great Britain 1940–1947

306
306
306
Military units and formations established in 1940
Military units and formations disestablished in 1946